Happily Ever After (originally released as Snow White: The Adventure Continues in the Philippines) is a 1989 animated musical fantasy film directed by John Howley, and starring the voices of Dom DeLuise, Malcolm McDowell, Phyllis Diller, Zsa Zsa Gabor, Ed Asner, Sally Kellerman, Irene Cara, Carol Channing and Tracey Ullman.

The film serves as a direct sequel to the Snow White fairytale, wherein the titular heroine and the Prince are about to be married, but a new threat appears in the form of the late evil Queen's vengeful brother Lord Maliss. The plot replaces the Dwarfs with female cousins called the Dwarfelles, who aid Snow White against Maliss.

Happily Ever After is unrelated to Filmation's fellow A Snow White Christmas, a 1982 TV special. Following extensive legal troubles with The Walt Disney Company, it had a poor financial and critical reception following its wide release in 1993. A video game adaptation was released in 1994.

Plot
The film starts as the Looking Glass recaps the story of "Snow White.” The Evil Queen is gone following her death, and the kingdom is now at peace as Snow White and the Prince prepare to get married. Back at the late Queen's castle, her animal minions celebrate their freedom by throwing a party for themselves. The Queen's wizard brother, Lord Maliss, arrives at the castle, looking for his sister. After learning about the Queen's recent demise, he vows to avenge her death by any means necessary. He transforms into a dragon and takes control of the castle, transforming the area surrounding both the castle and the kingdom into a perilous wasteland. Afterwards, Scowl the owl starts training his companion, a bat named Batso, on the ways of evil. 

The next day, Snow White and the Prince are in the meadow picking flowers for their wedding, when Maliss, in his wyvern form, begins attacking Snow White and the Prince as they are traveling to the cottage of the Seven Dwarfs. Maliss subdues the Prince and captures him, while Snow White manages to flee into the woods and reaches the cottage of the Seven Dwarfs. Snow White meets the Dwarves' female cousins, the Seven "Dwarfelles:” Muddy, Sunburn, Blossom, Marina, Critterina, Moonbeam, and Thunderella. Snow White learns that The Dwarves have left the cottage after they bought another mine in a different kingdom, but the Dwarfelles gladly assist taking her to visit Mother Nature at Rainbow Falls. 

Upon arriving at Rainbow Falls, Mother Nature holds Thunderella accountable for not being able to master her powers correctly, accuses the other Dwarfelles of improperly using their powers, and threatens to take them away as punishment if they don't learn. Maliss arrives unexpectedly and attacks them, but Mother Nature shoots him with lightning, causing him to crash and return to his human form. Before leaving, Maliss informs Snow White that the Prince is being held captive in his castle. Snow White and the Dwarfelles travel to Maliss' castle in the Realm of Doom, encountering a strange cloaked humanoid known as the Shadow Man, along the way. Maliss sends his one-horned wolves after the group and they manage to escape with the help of the Shadow Man. 

Maliss is furious at this failure and transforms into his dragon form, finally succeeding in capturing Snow White and taking her to his castle. The Dwarfelles follow them and sneak into the castle, while fending off Maliss' minions, including Scowl and Batso. In the castle, Snow White is reunited with the Prince, who begins acting strangely and takes her through a secret passage to supposedly escape. Snow White not only realizes that he is not the real Prince, but he is actually Lord Maliss in disguise. Maliss attempts to throw a magical cloak on Snow White to petrify her into stone. He almost succeeds, but is attacked by the Shadow Man, whom he overpowers and seemingly kills. 

As Maliss tries again to petrify Snow White, the seven Dwarfelles arrive and attack him, but fail to do so and become petrified by Maliss. The only one unharmed is Thunderella, who finally gains control of her powers and assists Snow White to defeat Maliss. The cloak is thrown on top of him and he is permanently petrified in mid-transition between his human and dragon forms. As the sun shines onto the castle, the Dwarfelles are restored back to normal while Snow White tearfully mourns the Shadow Man, believing that she has lost both him and the prince. Suddenly, the Shadow Man transforms into the Prince and awakens. The Prince reveals that Maliss had cast a spell on him and he has been watching over Snow White during her journey. 

Mother Nature decides to let the Dwarfelles keep their powers, having finally proven themselves by working together as one, and she allows them to attend Snow White's wedding. In the end, Mother Nature takes in Batso and Scowl to be trained as her new apprentices. In the process, Scowl has stopped smoking thanks to Sunburn and is able to breathe again. He then comments to Batso that working for Mother Nature won't be so bad. With Snow White and the Prince reunited with each other, the film ends as the two of them share a kiss and begin to live happily ever after.

Cast
 Irene Cara as Snow White, the beautiful young princess who is now engaged to the Prince.
 Malcolm McDowell as Lord Maliss, a terrible and powerful wizard who seeks revenge for the death of his sister the Evil Queen by destroying his step-niece Snow White and her prince.
 Phyllis Diller as Mother Nature, a ditsy embodiment of the forces of nature that gave the Seven Dwarfelles their powers.
 Michael Horton as The Prince, Snow White's handsome fiancé who is now being kidnapped by his fiancé's step uncle, Lord Maliss.
 Dom DeLuise as the Looking Glass, a smart-alec mirror who had served the evil Queen and now does the bidding of Maliss and speaks in rhymes.
 Carol Channing as Muddy, a Dwarfelle who has power over the earth and the bossy leader of the Seven Dwarfelles.
 Zsa Zsa Gabor as Blossom, a Dwarfelle who has power over plants and flowers.
 Linda Gary as:
 Marina, a Dwarfelle who has power over all lakes and rivers.
 Critterina, a Dwarfelle who has power over animals. Her physical appearance strongly resembles that of a squirrel.
 Jonathan Harris as the Sunflower, Mother Nature's grumpy assistant. 
 Sally Kellerman as Sunburn, a Dwarfelle who has power over sunlight and has a foul temper. At heart, she is a nice and helpful individual.
 Tracey Ullman as:
 Moonbeam, a Dwarfelle who has power over the night. As shown by Muddy, she is asleep during the daytime causing her to sleepwalk.
 Thunderella, a Dwarfelle who has power over the weather including thunder and lightning.
 Ed Asner as Scowl, a sarcastic owl who enjoys smoking and tries to impress Maliss. Due to his smoking habit, he is often seen coughing and wheezing (heavily implying that he's developed a chronic breathing problem).
 Frank Welker as Batso, a timid bat who is Scowl's best friend.
 Welker also provides the uncredited vocal effects of Maliss' dragon form, the Shadow Man, and the one-horned wolves.

Music

Production
Production commenced in 1986, done 60% overseas. Filmation had previously developed a plan to create a series of direct-to-video sequels to popular Disney motion pictures, but only Pinocchio and the Emperor of the Night and Happily Ever After were completed.

According to producer Lou Scheimer, Black actress Irene Cara's casting as Snow White was regarded by many (including Cara herself) at the time as strangely "colorblind.” Mother Nature's original actress was Joni Mitchell. Scheimer also noted his version of Snow White as the story's actual heroine as it is she who rescues the prince in an inversion of the traditional version. Maliss was based on Basil Rathbone.

However, then–Walt Disney Productions chairman Jeffrey Katzenberg and spokesman Tom Deegan regarded the projects as "blatant rip-offs" of their properties. This led to a lawsuit by The Walt Disney Company in 1987 following the release of Emperor of the Night. Filmation thus promised their characters would not resemble those of the Disney incarnation and changed the title to Happily Ever After. Working titles included Snow White in the Land of Doom, Snow White and the Seven Dwarfelles and Snow White: The Adventure Continues. Some early merchandise used Snow White in the Land of Doom.

Release
Reportedly completed by 1988, the film premiered in the Philippines on June 30, 1989 as Snow White: The Adventure Continues. It was also released in 1990 in France as Snow White in the Land of Doom. Theatrical exhibition in the United States was intended sometime around late 1988 or early 1989; however, because Filmation shut down in 1989, it didn't see a release in the US until May 28, 1993, the same summer that Disney's Snow White and the Seven Dwarfs received a re-release. The four-day Memorial Day weekend taking was $1.76 million, $2.8 million after ten days and $3.2 million by the next month. The release was preceded by a $10 million advertising campaign and a substantial merchandising effort from North American distributor First National Film Corp. First National's bankruptcy followed just weeks after the film's failed premiere; its President, Milton Verret, was found guilty of defrauding investors.

Home media
Happily Ever After was issued on VHS and LaserDisc by Worldvision and later on DVD (in an edit censoring some violence) by 20th Century Fox Home Entertainment. In 2007, BCI Eclipse released a Storybook-themed DVD set with Happily Ever After, Journey Back to Oz and A Snow White Christmas.

As of 2021, rights are owned by Universal Pictures through DreamWorks Animation under their ownership of DreamWorks Classics, which holds much of the Filmation catalog.

Reception
Despite a substantial advertising campaign and having been expected to become "one of the biggest hits of the year,” Happily Ever After performed poorly in the box office during its theatrical run. Its domestic gross was only $3,299,382.

It received generally negative reviews. According to Stephen Holden of The New York Times, "visually, Happily Ever After is mundane. The animation is jumpy, the settings flat, the colors pretty but less than enchanting. The movie's strongest element is its storytelling, which is not only imaginative but also clear and smoothly paced.” Kevin Thomas of Los Angeles Times opined the characters (especially the Prince) were "bland" and called the film's songs "instantly forgettable.” Rita Kemple of The Washington Post derided the "inane" humor attempts as well as "badly drawn characters" and their "clumsy" animation. Desert News' Chris Hicks similarly wrote: "Sadly, the animation here is weak, the gags even weaker and the story completely uninvolving". Steve Daly of Entertainment Weekly gave the film a score of F and recommended to "give this Snow White the big kiss-off". Chicago Tribune'''s Mark Caro wrote that the comparison with Disney's classic Snow White "couldn't be more brutal.” The film currently has a 40% approval rating based on 10 reviews on Rotten Tomatoes, with an average rating of 5.9/10.

Other reviews were more positive. Jeff Shannon of Seattle Times opined that "this one's a cut above in the animation contest, deserving attention in the once-exclusive realm of Disney and Don Bluth. It almost, but not quite, escapes those nagging comparisons.” Ralph Novak of People wrote that although "the animation is less sophisticated than the Disney standard,” the story "moves nicely, though,” with a "colorful" cast of voices. Candice Russell of Sun-Sentinel'' called it "a sweet and likable film,” crediting a screenplay "that avoids cuteness and sentimentality and remembers that kiddie fare is fun" and "a few charming songs adding to the merriment.”

Video game

An unreleased Nintendo Entertainment System video game was planned in 1991. A Sega game was also considered in 1993. An eventual Super Nintendo Entertainment System version was developed by ASC Games and released by Imagitec Design four years later (and one year after the film's release) in 1994.

Notes

References

External links

Official website (Special Edition DVD)

1989 films
1989 animated films
1980s American animated films
1980s children's animated films
1980s fantasy adventure films
American children's animated adventure films
American children's animated fantasy films
American children's animated musical films
American fantasy adventure films
Filmation animated films
Films about owls
Films about bats
Films about royalty
Films about shapeshifting
Films about witchcraft
Films about wizards
Films based on Snow White
Unofficial sequel films
1980s English-language films
Films produced by Lou Scheimer